ADC-Ikibiri (Alliance of Democrats for Change) is a coalition of opposition parties and movements in Burundi.

Political party alliances in Burundi